Bogdan Stević (Serbian Cyrillic: Богдан Стевић; born 4 June 1987) is a Serbian footballer who plays for FC Srbija Zürich in the Swiss 2. Liga.

On 20 January 2009 it was officially announced that he signed for Partizan with a 5-year deal. He made 6 appearances for Partizan, of which one was in the second half of the 2008–09 Serbian SuperLiga. He played with Partizan satellite club FK Teleoptik in the 2010–11 Serbian First League.

References

External links

 Profile at Football Database

1987 births
Living people
Footballers from Belgrade
Serbian footballers
Association football defenders
FK Radnički Obrenovac players
FK Teleoptik players
FK Partizan players
Serbian First League players
Serbian SuperLiga players
Serbian expatriate footballers
Expatriate footballers in Switzerland